Henderson-Massey is a local government area in Auckland, in New Zealand's Auckland Region, governed by the Henderson-Massey Local Board and Auckland Council. It currently aligns with the council's Waitākere Ward.

Geography

The area includes the suburbs of Henderson and Massey, as well as the surrounding suburbs of Glendene, Lincoln, Ranui, Royal Heights, Sunnyvale, Te Atatu Peninsula, Te Atatu South, Westgate and West Harbour. The main town centres are in Henderson and Westgate.

The foothills of the Waitākere Ranges are located in the east, and the Waitematā Harbour is located the east. The Te Wai-o-Pareira / Henderson Creek, Oratia and Opanuku streams and their tributaries flow from the ranges to the sea.

The Motu Manawa (Pollen Island) Marine Reserve is located in Te Atatu, and features ecologically important saltmarshes and the endangered railbird.

Features

Corban Estate Arts Centre, Henderson Valley Studios, Whoa Studios, West Wave Aquatic Centre, The Trusts Arena, the Netball Waitakere complex, and the Massey Leisure Centre are located in the area.

Te Whanau o Waipareira Trust operates primarily from the Henderson town centre.

References

 
West Auckland, New Zealand